Marcia Harris (born Lena Hill, February 14, 1868 – June 18, 1947) was an American actress. She appeared in 48 films between 1915 and 1932.

She was born in Providence, Rhode Island, and as an amateur acted primarily in male lead roles with the Chelsea Club theatrical organization in Boston.

Harris's Broadway credits included The Adding Machine (1923), What Happened to Jones (1917), Rich Man, Poor Man (1916), and All Aboard (1913. Her other work on stage included the musical production Alma, Where Do You Live? (1911).

Harris died in Northampton, Massachusetts.

Partial filmography

 The Foundling (1915)
 The Foundling (1916)
 Susie Snowflake (1916)
 Great Expectations (1917)
 The Poor Little Rich Girl (1917)
 Every Girl's Dream (1917)
 The Little Boy Scout (1917)
 Madame Jealousy (1918)
 Prunella (1918)
 Day Dreams (1919)
 The Bishop's Emeralds (1919)
 Kathleen Mavourneen (1919)
 Anne of Green Gables (1919)
 The Flapper (1920)
 The Right to Love (1920)
 Orphans of the Storm (1921)
 A Heart to Let (1921)
 The Girl from Porcupine (1921)
 Oh Mary Be Careful (1921)
 The Fighting Blade (1923)
 On the Banks of the Wabash (1923)
 The Truth About Wives (1923)
 Sinners in Heaven (1924)
 Isn't Life Wonderful (1924)
 Who's Cheating? (1924)
 Lena Rivers (1925)
 The King on Main Street (1925)
 Love 'Em and Leave 'Em (1926)
 So's Your Old Man (1926)
 Backstage (1927)
 The Music Master (1927)
 Take Me Home (1928)
 Brotherly Love (1928)
 The Squall (1929)
 The Greene Murder Case (1929)
 Young as You Feel (1931)
 Three Wise Girls (1932)

References

External links

1868 births
American film actresses
American silent film actresses
20th-century American actresses
Actors from Providence, Rhode Island
Actresses from Rhode Island
1947 deaths
American stage actresses